Total Frat Movie is a 2016 comedy film directed by Warren P. Sonoda and starring Justin Deeley, Alex House, Steven Yaffee, Rebecca Dalton and Tom Green.

Cast
Justin Deeley as Charlie Martin
Alex House as Billy Taylor
Steven Yaffee as John 'Douchenozzle' MacGyver
Rebecca Dalton as Katie Littleton
Tom Green as Dean Kravitz
Nick Bateman as Alexander 'AJ' Chesterfield
Jamie Johnston as Alex Watson

References

External links
 
 

American comedy films
Canadian comedy films
English-language Canadian films
Films directed by Warren P. Sonoda
2010s English-language films
2010s Canadian films
2010s American films